This War of Mine is a war survival video game developed and published by the Polish game development company 11 Bit Studios. The game differs from most war-themed video games by focusing on the civilian experience of war rather than front line combat. Characters have to make many difficult decisions in order to survive everyday dangers. There are various endings for each character, depending on the decisions made in the game. The game has received multiple DLC's and sold over 7 million units worldwide across multiple platforms.

Gameplay
This War of Mine is a survival-themed strategy game where the player controls a group of civilian survivors hiding inside a damaged house in the besieged fictional city of Pogoren, Graznavia. The main goal of the game is to stay alive during the war with the tools and materials that the player can gather. Most of the characters under the player's control have no military background nor any kind of survival experience and will require constant intervention by the player in order to stay alive. The player must maintain their characters' health, hunger, and mood levels until the declaration of a ceasefire, which occurs after a randomized duration.

In the daytime, the survivors will have to stay inside because there are hostile snipers outside, thereby offering the player time to craft tools from gathered materials, trade, upgrade the shelter, cook food and heal the survivors. At night, the player is given the opportunity to go out and search nearby areas for valuable resources to survive day by day. During their excursions, the survivors, controlled by players, can encounter other NPC survivors of the war, who they can choose to assist by offering food or medicine, or rob and kill. The player can also build a radio inside their shelter, which will provide useful information such as weather warnings, updates on the city's economy, and news of the ongoing war effort to help the player plan appropriate shelter upgrades and scavenging missions.

The player starts off with one to four survivors whose actions the player can affect. The actions the player makes will change the type of endings each survivor has. Each character has one or two traits that helps/hinders the player, besides hidden, varying stats that affect combat, movement speed, and so on. Some traits are useful during certain days while others are useful all the time. For example, one character named Bruno has a trait called "Good Cook", which helps the player use less fuel and water when cooking meals. There are a total of 12 playable characters. The Little Ones DLC includes the possibility of adding an extra character, a child survivor, that cannot defend itself or perform any of the tasks needed to maintain the shelter at first. In addition, the child survivor must be given constant attention to prevent it from becoming depressed but can be taught by the other survivors to perform small chores like cooking, filtering water, or growing crops, and once bonded with an adult, it can sleep with them in the same bed at night, removing the need for a separate bed for both.

Development and release
The game was inspired by the poor living conditions and wartime atrocities that Bosnian civilians endured during the 1992–96 Siege of Sarajevo, the longest city siege since World War II. 

This War of Mine was released for Microsoft Windows, MacOS, and Linux in November 2014. The Android port was released on July 14, 2015, followed by the iOS port on the following day (July 15). In November 2014, unlicensed copies of the game were made available online. The developer's response was to post a number of working Steam keys, encouraging downloaders to share them with friends, and buy the game if their financial situation allowed.

Post-release
A scenario editor was added into the game through update 1.3, which allows players to create and select survivors. The editor also allows environmental conditions and the length of conflicts to be changed.

Player-created content was released freely via the Steam Workshop as of update 2.0.

A DLC called War Childs was released for a limited time between March 9 and April 3 2015 on Steam to raise funds for the War Child charity. This DLC contained unique street art pieces that players could find with three tiers of content, depending on the amount of money donated. On 3 April 2015 11 Bit Studios announced that the donations received had been enough to change the lives of over 350 children.

Another DLC, focusing on children, called The Little Ones was released for consoles on 29 January 2016 and PC on 1 June, 2016.

To celebrate the game's third anniversary, 11 bit Studios released three story-driven DLC's called This War of Mine: Stories: Father's Promise (released on 14th november 2017), The Last Broadcast (released on 14th november 2018) and Fading Embers (released on 06th august 2019).

In November 2018, 11 bit studios announced This War Of Mine: Complete Edition exclusively for the Nintendo Switch, releasing later the same month. This version compiles all the content in a single package, including the original base game, the Anniversary Edition content, The Little Ones, and its episodic Fathers Promise and all upcoming content including The Last Broadcast, and Fading Embers. A physical retail version of the game was also released in Europe for the Nintendo Switch the same day, through Deep Silver.

At November 14, 2019 11 bit studios released a free content update called This War of Mine: Final Cut.

Reception

Critical reception
The iOS version of This War of Mine received "universal acclaim", while the PC and console versions received "generally favorable reviews" according to the review aggregation website Metacritic.

The Digital Fix gave the PC version nine out of ten and said, "Whether you choose to perceive it through a moral lens or not, there’s a great tactical survival mechanic driving this game beneath the didactics. Although the events it depicts are depressing to contemplate at length, I found myself coming back again and again to try and get it right somehow, beat the odds, and save my people." The same website also gave the PlayStation 4 version of The Little Ones eight out of ten and said, "While better on PC, the PS4 release brings this remarkable game to a new crowd." 411Mania gave the Xbox One version 8.5 out of 10 and said that it was "not a game I will recommend if you like settling down for a visceral experience, or earning XP, or shooting stuff dead. It's not fast paced. It's not much fun to actually play. It'll make you feel terrible about your actions at almost every turn. But in spite of all that, there is something so essential about this gaming experience that I urge you to give this game a try." Digital Spy gave the PC version four stars out of five and said that the "earnest human touch keeps This War of Mine compelling even when you mess up and the rubble all comes tumbling down around you, leaving you just enough hope for the next attempt that you'll dive back in and endure it all again." Metro UK gave the PS4 version seven out of ten and called it "A daring, and largely successful, attempt to show the civilian side of war, that succeeds as an interactive drama even when it occasionally fails as a game." However, Slant Magazine gave the same console version two stars out of five and said that the game "seems interested only in presenting a near-pornographic level of human despair in a warped attempt at edifying players."

The game reportedly made back its development costs in its first two days for sale, and had sold over 4.5 million units by April 2019.

Sales
The game sold about 700,000 copies during its first year of release. The game's release on consoles and mobile devices expanded its audience, and the game was able to maintain steady sales and growth five years after its initial launch, according to 11 bit's publishing director Paweł Feldman. As of May, 2022, the game has sold over 7 million copies across all platforms.

Impact
In 2020, the Polish Chancellery of the Prime Minister announced that This War of Mine would be added to the recommended reading list in Polish high schools during the academic year of 2020–2021. This was the first initiative in the world to add a video game to recommended readings in school. 
The Microsoft Windows version of the game is free to download from the Polish government's website, alongside lesson topics for teachers.

Following the 2022 Russian invasion of Ukraine, 11 Bit Studios announced that all profits earned from This War of Mine for seven days starting 24 February 2022 would be donated to the Ukrainian Red Cross to directly support victims. Within the week the company had raised over £500,000. In total $850,000 was raised.

Other media 
A cooperative board game version was released in 2017 by Galakta in cooperation with 11-bit studios.

References

External links

11 bit studios games
2014 video games
Action-adventure games
Android (operating system) games
Anti-war video games
IOS games
Linux games
MacOS games
Nintendo Switch games
PlayStation 4 games
Survival video games
Video games developed in Poland
Windows games
Single-player video games
Monochrome video games
Theft in fiction
Xbox One games
Stealth video games
Video games with Steam Workshop support
Video games featuring female protagonists
Video games set in a fictional country
Independent Games Festival winners